Nicholas Carlson is the global editor-in-chief of Insider. Before that, he was Insider's chief correspondent.

Carlson is also the author of Marissa Mayer and the Fight to Save Yahoo!. Carlson won a Longform award for best business coverage for his reporting on AOL CEO Tim Armstrong's controversial investment in local news initiative, Patch.

References

American non-fiction writers
Year of birth missing (living people)
Living people
Place of birth missing (living people)